The Novel Magazine was the first British all-fiction pulp magazine. It ran from 1905 to 1937 when it was absorbed into The Grand Magazine.

From 1918 to 1922 The Novel Magazine was edited by the writer E. C. Vivian.

Contributors of fiction to The Novel Magazine included Rafael Sabatini,  Agatha Christie, Elinor Glyn, R. Austin Freeman, Edgar Wallace, Sax Rohmer, Baroness Orczy and P. G. Wodehouse. The Novel Magazine also published ghost stories and weird fiction by Barry Pain, A. M. Burrage, Elliott O'Donnell, and "Theo Douglas" (the pseudonym of H. D. Everett).

References

External links 

P. G. Wodehouse works in The Novel Magazine

Magazines established in 1905
Magazines disestablished in 1937
Defunct literary magazines published in the United Kingdom
1905 establishments in the United Kingdom
1937 disestablishments in the United Kingdom
Pulp magazines